Shanmughasundaram Mohan (11 February 1930 – 27 December 2019) was former Indian Supreme Court Judge and former Acting Governor of Karnataka state. He has authored 11 books in English and seven books in Tamil.

Biography
Shanmughasundaram Mohan was born in Udumalpet of Coimbatore district on 11 February 1930. After completing graduation from Presidency College Madras, he did his bachelor's degree in law from University of Madras and Masters in Constitution and International Law. Enrolled as advocate in the High Court of Madras in August 1954, he became government pleader in 1969. From 1956 to 1966, Mohan served as a part-time lecturer in Law College, Madras.

He was appointed Advocate General of Madras in 1971. In February 1974, he was appointed additional judge of Madras High Court and became permanent Judge on 1 August 1975. He was appointed Chief Justice of the Karnataka High Court on 19 October 1989, became Supreme Court Justice on 7 October 1991 and retired from the service on 10 February 1995.

In the wake of removal of Pendekanti Venkatasubbaiah in 1990, he served as Acting Governor of Karnataka state from 5 February 1990 to 8 May 1990.

After retirement Justice Mohan was appointed chairman of the National Cyber Safety and Security Standards and Chairman of Pay Revision Committee of Public Sector Undertakings, Government of India. In 2004, he was appointed by the Madras High Court to ensure free and fair elections in the BCCI.

He died on 27 December 2019 at Chennai, Tamil Nadu.

Literary contributions
Mohan has authored 11 books in English on varied subjects and seven books in Tamil including a collections of poems. He served as the president of the World Academy of Arts and Culture and was the president of the World Congress of Poets for six years during 2004–2010. Justice Triumphs, Wild Blooms,  Random Reflections, His Many Splendored Gem and Law and Social Justice are some of the books he wrote in English language.

Awards and honors
Sri Muthuswamy Iyer Scholarship.
Lakshminarasa Reddy Gold Medal
Madras University's gold medal for securing a first class in the law course in 1952
He was honored giving honorary doctorate degrees from four Universities, including three foreign Universities

References

1930 births
2019 deaths
21st-century Indian judges
Judges of the Madras High Court
Chief Justices of the Madras High Court
Chief Justices of the Karnataka High Court
20th-century Indian judges
People from Coimbatore district
20th-century Indian lawyers
Justices of the Supreme Court of India